Abdus Sattar is a politician and the former Member of Bangladesh Parliament of Laxmipur-3.

Career
Sattar was elected to parliament from Laxmipur-3 as a combined opposition candidate in 1988.

References

Living people
4th Jatiya Sangsad members
Year of birth missing (living people)